Baron O'Neill is a title in the Peerage of the United Kingdom.

Baron O'Neill may also refer to:

Terence O'Neill, Baron O'Neill of the Maine (1914–1990), Prime Minister of Northern Ireland from 1963 to 1969
Martin O'Neill, Baron O'Neill of Clackmannan (1945–2020), Scottish politician
Jim O'Neill, Baron O'Neill of Gatley (born 1957), British economist